Baron Elton, of Headington in the County of Oxford, is a title in the Peerage of the United Kingdom. It was created on 16 January 1934 for the historian Godfrey Elton. As of 2009 the title is held by his son, the second Baron, who succeeded in 1973. He held minor office in the Conservative administrations of Edward Heath and Margaret Thatcher and was until 2021 one of the ninety elected hereditary peers that remain in the House of Lords after the passing of the House of Lords Act 1999.

History
Descent
The Elton family is descended in male line from Richard Elton born 1630 and died 1695 and resided at Newent, Gloucestershire.

Barons Elton (1934—)

  Godfrey Elton, 1st Baron Elton (1892–1973)
  Rodney Elton, 2nd Baron Elton (1930—)
 (1) Hon. Edward Paget Elton (1966—)
 (2) Charles William Page Elton (2010—)

The heir apparent is the present holder's son, the Hon. Edward Paget Elton (born 1966).

The heir apparent's heir apparent is the present holder's grandson, Charles William Page Elton (born 2010).

Coat of arms

Notes

References
Kidd, Charles, Williamson, David (editors). Debrett's Peerage and Baronetage (1990 edition). New York: St Martin's Press, 1990, 

Baronies in the Peerage of the United Kingdom
Noble titles created in 1934